The B. C. Calvert House is a historic Late Victorian style house located in Union, Kentucky. It was built in 1875, and on February 6, 1989, it was added to the National Register of Historic Places.

It is a five-bay, central passage plan house with a three-bay porch with turned posts and a bracketed cornice.  It was deemed notable as "a good example of Folk Victorian architecture significant to Boone County in the period 1875-1900."

The property includes two outbuildings and a brick smokehouse which are contemporary with the house.

References

Calvert
Houses in Boone County, Kentucky
Houses on the National Register of Historic Places in Kentucky
Union, Kentucky
Central-passage houses
1875 establishments in Kentucky
Houses completed in 1875